Blockchain Capital (formerly Crypto Currency Partners) is a venture capital company founded in 2013 by Bart Stephens and Brad Stephens. As the first, dedicated venture capital firm exclusively focused on investing across the blockchain ecosystem, Blockchain Capital is one of the most active and experienced venture investors in blockchain technology.

History 
In 2013, Blockchain Capital became the first venture capital fund dedicated to crypto builders. The company also pioneered the world’s first tokenized investment fund and the blockchain industry’s first security token, the BCAP, which was sold through a security token offering in April 2017. Blockchain Capital held this initial coin offering (ICO) as an experiment, which helped the company to raise $10 million in just six hours.

As an industry pioneer, Blockchain Capital's Funds provide broad-based exposure across the entire sector, from Web3 to decentralized finance (DeFi) to Infrastructure and beyond.

The company invested in several notable category leaders,  including Opensea, Kraken, Ethereum, and Coinbase.

Today, Blockchain Capital has $2B in assets under management across five fully invested funds and two current investment funds, focuses solely on venture investing (no trading, shorting or hedging), and has backed over 170+ founders since inception.

Founding Team 
Blockchain Capital was founded in October 2013 by Bart Stephens and Bradford Stephens.

Bart Stephens is a three-time founder whose career has focused on emerging technologies. Bart has founded an internet company, a hedge fund, and a venture capital firm. Prior to Blockchain Capital, Bart was Managing Partner and a founder of Stephens Investment Management (SIM), a hedge fund firm that in 2002 invented the term and pioneered the strategy “Nanocap” investing – venture capital style investing in the public markets focused on sub-micro-cap equities. Prior to founding SIM, Bart was Executive Vice President, Venture Capital for Ivanhoe Capital Corporation (ICC), an international investment firm.

Bart earned a B.A. in Political Science from Princeton University, where his academic work focused on information warfare and national security topics.

Before joining ICC, Bart was a Co-founder and Head of Corporate & Business Development for Oncology.com. Oncology.com grew to become the internet’s largest network of cancer-related websites before being sold to Pharmacia (now Pfizer) in 2001. Bart started his career at fintech pioneer E*TRADE, where he worked in corporate development and in the advanced products group.

Brad Stephens is the Founder and Managing Partner. Prior to Blockchain Capital, Brad was Managing Partner of Stephens Investment Management LLC (SIM), which he founded in 2002. His diverse background in domestic and international finance includes sell-side securities analysis, hedge fund management, venture capital, and family office management.Prior to co-founding SIM, Brad worked as the senior analyst at Fidelity Ventures, the venture capital arm of Fidelity Investments. At Fidelity, Brad focused on the areas of Internet Security and New Media, and also founded Fidelity’s Biometric Consortium, a cutting-edge collaboration of all Fidelity’s business units designed to explore, pilot, and implement biometric security systems within Fidelity and eventually its consumer clients.

Brad holds a B.A. in economics from Duke University.

Brad also worked as a research analyst in CSFB’s Technology Group, specializing in Internet Security and Internet Infrastructure Software. While at CSFB, Brad helped raise over $1.3 billion for companies under coverage. Prior to working at CSFB, Brad worked as a research analyst at Furman Selz (later acquired by ING Barings), where he co-founded their Internet Research Group and co-authored the first financial industry piece on Internet Security.

References

External links
 

Financial services companies established in 2013
Companies based in San Francisco
Venture capital firms of the United States
2013 establishments in California